Rosario is a 2013 Spanish-language telenovela produced by Venevisión International in collaboration with United States-based television network Univision. It is an original story written by Alex Haddad. The production started on July 31, 2012.

On April 26, 2012, it was confirmed that Alex Haddad would write Rosario. On July 24, it was confirmed that Lupita Jones will make her acting debut. Both Zuleyka Rivera and Lorena Rojas will star as the antagonists. Guy Ecker and Itahisa Machado will star as the main protagonists.

Plot 
A beautiful and intelligent young woman named Rosario (Itahisa Machado) falls in love with her boss, Alejandro (Guy Ecker), a prominent lawyer twenty-one years older than she. Rosario does not know that Alejandro is the same man whose mother, Magdalena (Natalia Ramírez), was engaged to marry twenty-one years ago; Magdalena has kept her romance with Alejandro in secret. In the past, Alejandro broke his engagement to Magdalena on learning that she had become pregnant with Marcos (Leonardo Daniel) as a result of rape. Alejandro, convinced that he could never accept, nor love, a creature that was begotten by his worst enemy decides to abandon it. The irony is that years later that child, Rosario, would become the great love of his life. The love of a young woman for the man she should never have fallen in love with; the love of a man towards the woman he swore he could never love; and the conflict of a mother when she meets the man she was about to marry and who is currently her daughter's boyfriend.

Cast
Confirmed as of July 31, 2012.
Itahisa Machado as Rosario Pérez
Guy Ecker as Alejandro Montalbán
Aarón Díaz as Esteban Martínez
Lorena Rojas as Priscila Pavón
Natalia Ramirez as Magdalena Pérez
Ezequiel Montalt as Daniel Carvajal
Zully Montero as Regina Montalbán
Frances Ondiviela as Teresa Martínez
Zuleyka Rivera as Sandra Díaz
Rodrigo Vidal as Padre Bernardo
Tina Romero as Griselda
Anna Silvetti as Caridad Chávez
Gledys Ibarra as Antonia
Lupita Jones as Fabiana
Franklin Virgüez as Vicente
Alberto Salaberri as Jeronimo Guerra
Liliana Rodriguez as Ofilia Elsa
Scarlet Gruber as Cecilia Garza
Sandra Itzel as Barbara Montalbán
Greydis Gil as Silvia Villalobos
Adrián Di Monte as Ignacio "Nacho" Gómez
Christina Mason as Misericordia "Merci"
Sergio Reynoso as Manuel Pérez
Beatriz Monroy as Matilde
Carlos Garin as Guillermo Gómez
Juan Jiménez as Felipe
Fabiola Barinas as Zulema Torres
Leonardo Daniel as Marcos Miranda
Osvaldo Strongoli as Gregorio Giorgano
Lilimar Hernandez as Elenita
Samuel Sadovnik as Esteban Martínez Jr.
Nataniel Roman as Manny
Alberto Barros Jr. as the gardener
Melody Batule as Dr. Natalia
Luz Cordeiro as Sor Esperanza
Reinaldo Cruz as  Renato Villalobos
Alexander Estrella as Beto
Shanik Hughes as Cynthia
Ramon Morell as Dr. Lozada
Jorge Luis Portales as Matias
Elioret Silva as Detective Evora
Soledad Esponda as Mariana
Eslover Sanchez-Baquero as David (Fabiana's producer)
Victoria Zapata as Señora Silvestre
Laura Aleman as Cristina
Nadia Escobar as Carmencita

International release

References

Venezuelan telenovelas
2013 American television series debuts
2013 American television series endings
Venevisión telenovelas
Univision telenovelas
2013 telenovelas
Spanish-language American telenovelas
Television shows set in Miami